Cochleoceps orientalis, common name eastern cleaner-clingfish, is a species of clingfish that is endemic to the marine waters around southeastern Australia.

Description
Cochleoceps orientalis grows to approximately 55 mm long. It has no scales, instead being protected by mucous which covers the body in a thick coating. It has an intense orange to greenish-yellow colouration. The body is scattered with dark red spots that diminish in size and intensity toward the belly. Numerous, short, thin, blue, iridescent lines are present on the back and sides. These lines are generally perpendicular to the length of the body.

The posterior part of the ventral fins appear as a fleshy fringe, with the anterior part merging into the sucking disc. Parts of the disc have dermal papillae which are flat. These probably allow the fish to adhere to surfaces.

Distribution
Cochleoceps orientalis lives in the marine waters of the southeastern part of Australia. It is found around New South Wales from Seal Rocks to Mallacoota, Victoria.

Habitat and behaviour

Cochleoceps orientalis normally lives in the demersal zone at depths of 3 to 40 metres. It is most often found on the kelp species ecklonia radiata but can sometimes occur on ascidians and sponges at greater depths.

This species avoids swimming in open waters where it would vulnerable to predators. It instead it remains sucked onto kelp, and when moving, does so in short dashes.

Cochleoceps orientalis is known to clean parasites from red or other morwongs, leatherjackets (often known as ocean jackets),  eastern blue gropers, boxfish, and porcupinefish.

Life cycle
Adults deposit their eggs on kelp, with both males and females remaining at the site. However, only the male guards them.

References

Further reading
Briggs, J.C. in Paxton, J.R. & W.N. Eschmeyer (Eds). 1994. Encyclopedia of Fishes. Sydney: New South Wales University Press; San Diego: Academic Press [1995]. Pp. 240.
Brown, R.W. 1956. Composition of Scientific Words. R. W. Brown. Pp. 882.
Hutchins, J.B. 1991. Description of three new species of gobiesocid fishes from southern Australia, with a key to the species of Cochleoceps. Records of the Western Australian Museum. 15(3): 655-672.
Hutchins, J.B. In Gomon, M.F, J.C.M. Glover & R.H. Kuiter (Eds). 1994. The Fishes of Australia's South Coast. State Print, Adelaide. Pp. 992.
Hutchins, B. & R. Swainston. 1986. Sea Fishes of Southern Australia. Complete Field Guide for Anglers and Divers. Swainston Publishing. Pp. 180.
Kuiter, R.H. 1993. Coastal Fishes of South-Eastern Australia. Crawford House Press. Pp. 437.
Kuiter, R.H. 1996. Guide to Sea Fishes of Australia. New Holland. Pp. 433.

External links
Sydney Dives website, gallery of images (by Sarah Han-de-Beaux) showing eastern cleaner-clingfish swimming alone, or cleaning various species, including a Port Jackson shark, a white-ear damselfish, and a blue-lined goatfish.

orientalis
Fish described in 1991